Benoît Magimel (born 11 May 1974) is a French actor. He was 14 when he appeared in his first film, and has starred in a variety of roles in French cinema. At age 16, Magimel left school to pursue acting as a career. In 2001, he won the Best Actor award at the Cannes Film Festival for his role in Michael Haneke's The Piano Teacher. He also starred in Claude Chabrol's La Demoiselle d'honneur.

He won two consecutive César Awards for Best Actor for starring as an acting teacher diagnosed with late-stage cancer in Peaceful (2021) and the High Commissioner of French Polynesia De Roller in Pacifiction (2022).

Selected filmography

References

External links

 

Living people
20th-century French male actors
21st-century French male actors
French male film actors
French male television actors
French male child actors
Male actors from Paris
Best Supporting Actor César Award winners
Cannes Film Festival Award for Best Actor winners
1974 births
Best Actor César Award winners